Bulanovka (Bolan) is a rural locality (a village) in Sharovsky Selsoviet, Belebeyevsky District, Bashkortostan, Russia. The population was 409 as of 2010. There are 2 streets.

Geography 
Bulanovka is located 27 km southeast of Belebey (the district's administrative centre) by road. Glukhovskaya is the nearest rural locality.

References 

Rural localities in Belebeyevsky District